Roeburndale is a civil parish in the City of Lancaster and the English county of Lancashire. In 2001 it had a population of 76. In the 2011 census Roeburndale was grouped with Claughton. The parish includes the village of Salter. The River Roeburn flows through the parish.

History 
In January 2022, one person was killed and others were injured when a bridge collapsed into the River Roeburn in Roeburndale.

See also
Listed buildings in Roeburndale

References

Geography of the City of Lancaster
Civil parishes in Lancashire
Forest of Bowland